Apatesia is a genus of flowering plants belonging to the family Aizoaceae.

Its native range is South African Republic.

Species:

Apatesia helianthoides 
Apatesia pillansii 
Apatesia sabulosa

References

Aizoaceae
Aizoaceae genera
Taxa named by N. E. Brown